Katarina Bartholdson (born 25 February 1941) is a Swedish former tennis player. She also played under her maiden name Katarina Frendelius.

A winner of 11 national championships in singles or doubles, Bartholdson made her only Federation Cup appearance in Sweden's debut tie in 1964, against Canada. She won her singles match against Benita Senn, but was beaten in the live doubles rubber, partnering Ulla Sandulf.

Bartholdson competed in multiple Wimbledon draws and reached the singles third round in 1963, where she lost to top seed Margaret Smith (later Court).

See also
List of Sweden Fed Cup team representatives

References

External links
 
 
 

1941 births
Living people
Swedish female tennis players